"Trust" is a song recorded by American recording artist Keyshia Cole. It was written by Cole and Frederick Taylor and co-produced by Donald "Toxic" Alford and Ron Fair for her third studio album, A Different Me (2008). It is a re-recording of the iTunes pre-order bonus song from Cole's previous album Just Like You.

In 2008, the ballad was re-recorded as a duet with fellow R&B singer Monica, replacing parts of Cole's original vocals with hers, and was included on Cole's third studio album A Different Me (2008). The song became Monica's sixteenth chart entry on the Hot 100, also becoming Cole's highest-peaking single from the album.

The accompanying music video for "Trust", directed by Chris Robinson, was ranked at 15th on BET's Notarized: Top 100 Videos of 2009 countdown. It also peaked on top on BET's 106 & Park.

Track listing
US promo single
 "Trust" (No Intro, Radio Edit) — 3:26
 "Trust" (With Intro, Radio Edit) — 3:46
 "Trust" (Album Version) — 4:16

Charts

Weekly charts

Year-end charts

References

External links
 KeyshiaCole.com — official site
 Monica.com — official site

2007 songs
2009 singles
Keyshia Cole songs
Monica (singer) songs
Music videos directed by Chris Robinson (director)
Song recordings produced by Ron Fair
Contemporary R&B ballads
Songs written by Keyshia Cole
Soul ballads
2000s ballads